Luzer Twersky (born July 26, 1985) is an American film and television actor. He is best known for his role in the film Felix and Meira, for which he garnered a Jutra Award nomination as Best Supporting Actor at the 18th Jutra Awards<ref>"«La passion d'Augustine» et «Corbo» nommes 10 fois aux Jutra". Canadian Press, January 25, 2016.</ref> and won the Best Actor award at the Amiens International Film Festival and the Torino International Film Festival.

Born and raised in Brooklyn as a Hasidic Jew, Twersky left the community in 2008, after struggling with his faith. He later met fashion designer Duncan Quinn, becoming a model and a retail manager for Quinn's store in Los Angeles, until taking his first acting role in 2010. By 2012, he was cast in his first leading role, in the film Where Is Joel Baum?.

In 2015, he also had a recurring role in the television series Transparent. He appeared in the second season of the HBO show High Maintenance.

In September 2017, he appeared as one of the main characters in the Netflix documentary One of Us'', where directors Heidi Ewing and Rachel Grady follow him years after he leaves his Hasidic community in Brooklyn, New York, and how he deals with his ostracization.

Twersky is a cousin of rabbi and transgender activist Abby Stein.

Twersky is mentioned in Penn Jillette's book "God, No!".

References

External links

1985 births
American male film actors
American male television actors
Former Orthodox Jews
Male actors from New York City
Jewish American male actors
Living people
Yiddish-speaking people
21st-century American Jews